Charles William Clark (October 16, 1891 – February 8, 1970) was a British-born Canadian professional ice hockey player. He played with the Vancouver Millionaires of the Pacific Coast Hockey Association, as a substitute goaltender, during the 1913–14 season.

Chuck Clark was born in Sevenoaks, Kent, and first played ice hockey in Strathcona, Alberta. He later played in Calgary with the Calgary Athletic Club.

References

Notes

1891 births
1970 deaths
Canadian ice hockey goaltenders
Ice hockey people from British Columbia
Vancouver Millionaires players
People from Sevenoaks
Sportspeople from Kent
British emigrants to Canada